Tony Zendejas (born May 15, 1960) is a Mexican-American former NFL placekicker. He was signed as an undrafted free agent by the Los Angeles Express of the United States Football League (USFL). After the USFL folded, he was selected in the first round of the 1984 NFL Supplemental draft by the Washington Redskins.

In his career, Zendejas also played for the Houston Oilers, Los Angeles Rams, Atlanta Falcons, and San Francisco 49ers of the National Football League (NFL).

Early years
Zendejas was born in Curimeo, Michoacán, Mexico. His parents moved the family to Chino, California. As a 12-year-old, he led the youth soccer league with 100 goals scored in one season.

He attended Chino High School where he practiced both soccer and football. As a junior, although he alternated at kicker with senior Tony Gonzales, he still managed to convert 7 field goals and 11 extra points in 12 games. His 53-yard field goal against Ganesha High School, was the second longest in CIF history.

As a senior, he set a single-season school record with 10 field goals. He also received All-CIF honors in soccer.

College career
In 1979, he enrolled at Santa Ana Junior College. At the time his main sport was soccer, until breaking his leg during a soccer tournament just before having a scheduled tryout with the Los Angeles Aztecs of the North American Soccer League.

In 1980, he transferred to Mt. San Antonio College. Although he couldn't play football while recovering from his injury, University of Nevada assistant coach John Smith recruited him based on what he did in high school.

In 1981, he transferred to Division I-AA University of Nevada, where he played under head coach Chris Ault. As a sophomore, he set school records for field goals made in a single-season (21) and longest field goal (55 yards).

As a junior, he set new conference and school records for field goals attempted (33) and field goals made (26).

As a senior, he converted 23 field goals and broke his school record for longest field goal (58 yards). He also made a 32-yard field goal in blizzard conditions to help win an overtime playoff game against the University of North Texas.

Zendejas played 3 seasons at Nevada, in 33 games he registered 70 field goals, 90 extra points and 300 points, while leading the nation in field goals made every year. Most of his kicking records were eventually broken by younger brother Marty Zendejas.

Professional career
Initially, he played in the United States Football League for the Los Angeles Express. He joined the National Football League when he was chosen by the Washington Redskins in the first round of the 1984 NFL Supplemental Draft of USFL and CFL Players.

During his eleven seasons in the NFL, Zendejas made 186 field goals in 252 attempts; he also scored 316 extra points for 874 points. He held the record for consecutive field goals made from 50 or more yards with 11 such kicks until  when the record was eclipsed by Blair Walsh of the Minnesota Vikings and Robbie Gould of the Chicago Bears.

In 1991, he became the first kicker in NFL history to convert all of his field goal attempts, going 17-of-17. He fell one missed extra point short of having the first "perfect season" for a kicker, a mark Gary Anderson reached seven years later.

NFL career statistics

Personal life
Zendejas was accused of drugging and raping a woman in January 2008, but he was acquitted of all charges in 2009. He owns and operates Zendajas Mexican Restaurant in San Dimas, California known to be very popular with Rams fans during the regular season games. He is the older brother of former Nevada and Arena league kicker Marty Zendejas, and the cousin of former NFL kickers Joaquin Zendejas, Luis Zendejas and Max Zendejas.

References

1960 births
Living people
Mexican players of American football
Sportspeople from Michoacán
American football placekickers
Nevada Wolf Pack football players
Los Angeles Express players
Houston Oilers players
Los Angeles Rams players
Atlanta Falcons players
San Francisco 49ers players
Mexican expatriates in the United States
Sportspeople from San Bernardino County, California
Players of American football from California
Soccer players from California
People from Chino, California
College men's soccer players in the United States
Mt. San Antonio College alumni
Association footballers not categorized by position
Association football players not categorized by nationality
Zendejas family